The Black Widow is the debut unreleased album by American rapper, Strings. The album was to be her official solo debut album (after the cancellation of her other album, with Rockland Records). After her departure from R. Kelly's label, she was signed to Keith Sweat's label in 1998 and recorded most of her songs the year for her album. The album spawned a total of two singles but only "Tongue Song" managed to chart. Because of the lack of charting performance from her singles and with no promotion from her label, the album was shelved; only the Listening Post Edition (promo CD) and sampler copies were pressed and for sale on Amazon and Discogs.

Singles
The album's lead single "Tongue Song" peaked at number 24 on Bubbling Under R&B/Hip-Hop Songs, number 13 on Hot Rap Songs and number 30 on Hot R&B/Hip-Hop Singles Sales chart.

The second single from the album, "Raise It Up" did not chart.

Track listing

References

2000 debut albums
Epic Records albums
Albums produced by Swizz Beatz
Albums produced by Keith Sweat
Albums produced by Mannie Fresh
Unreleased albums